Liberty is an unincorporated community in Liberty Township, Clarke County, Iowa, United States.

History
Liberty's population was 53 in 1902.

References

Unincorporated communities in Clarke County, Iowa
Unincorporated communities in Iowa